Zsolt Makay (born 16 August 1977) is a Hungarian politician who served as the last president of the Hungarian Democratic Forum.

References
 2010, MDF-jelöltek

1977 births
Living people
Hungarian Democratic Forum politicians